The Constitution Act or Constitutional Act is the name of several acts, notably:

The Act forming the original part of the Constitution of Australia
Several Acts forming part of the Constitution of Canada, such as:
The Constitution Act, 1867 (formerly called the British North America Act, 1867)
The Constitution Act, 1982
The Constitution Act (British Columbia)
 Constitutional Act of 1791, which divided Quebec into Upper Canada and Lower Canada for the benefit of newly arrived English-speakers
Constitutional act of the Czech Republic, the name of a kind of law in the Czech Republic which alters the Constitution
 Various pieces of Danish legislation, including:
Constitutional Act of the Kingdom of Denmark (1849), which provided the modern constitution for Denmark, ending the previous absolute monarchy
The Danish Act of Succession, known formally as, The Constitutional Act of Denmark of June 5, 1953 
Constitutional Act of 1934, which realigned representation in the Icelandic parliament such that it would be more harmonious with the popular vote
Some laws in or formerly in the Constitution of New Zealand:
New Zealand Constitution Act 1846
New Zealand Constitution Act 1852
Constitution Act 1986
Niue Constitution Act

See also
Constitution
Constitutional law (disambiguation)